Hexastylis virginica, commonly known as Virginia heartleaf, is a prostrate perennial plant in the Aristolochiaceae (birthwort family). It is found in the mideastern United States from Maryland and Virginia in the north, south to North Carolina and Tennessee. The plant is encountered in deciduous and mixed forests. Its flowers emerge in early spring from April through June.

References

External links

Aristolochiaceae
Flora of the Southeastern United States
Flora of the Appalachian Mountains
Plants described in 1753
Taxa named by Carl Linnaeus